Jeff Mercel is an American multi-instrumentalist, composer, and studio musician, best known for his time in the indie rock band, Mercury Rev.

Early life and education
Jeff Mercel attended SUNY Fredonia, graduating with a Bachelor of Arts in 1993. In 1996, Mercel played drums with the band Grand Mal on their self-titled album released by Number Six Records.

Time with Mercury Rev
Mercel first played with Mercury Rev on their breakthrough 1998 album, "Deserter's Songs", playing drums, both in studio and on tour.  For the band's next album, 2001's "All is Dream", his role expanded to pianos, contributing to the arranging, mixing, and producing.  He stayed with Mercury Rev for the next nine years, playing on the albums "The Secret Migration" (2005), "Hello Blackbird" (2006), "Back to Mine" (2006), "Snowflake Midnight" (2008), and "Strange Attractor" (2008).  In 2011 Mercel rejoined with the band for a world tour to promote the release of the double disc reissue of "Deserter's Songs."

Work as a composer
During his time with Mercury Rev, Mercel helped score the feature-length film, Bye Bye, Blackbird (2005). In 2010, Mercel left working with Mercury Rev full-time to pursue work as a composer.  His work has appeared in numerous television shows such as CSI: Crime Scene Investigation on CBS, and Showtime's  This American Life.  His work can also be heard in commercials for BMW, and a Got Milk? ad campaign featuring Salma Hayek.

Mercel has also worked in film scoring the animated short, Marvin (2010) starring Steve Coogan, and the live action shorts Daniel (2010), Chaser (2012), and Sam (2012).  In 2012 he composed the music for the feature film "5 Shells."

Discography

Filmography

References

External links
 Official Site

American multi-instrumentalists
Living people
Year of birth missing (living people)